The Georgios Karaiskakis Stadium, commonly referred to as the Karaiskakis Stadium, is a football stadium in Piraeus, Attica, Greece, and the home ground of the Piraeus football club Olympiacos. It is named after Georgios Karaiskakis, a military commander of the Greek War of Independence, who is considered a national hero and was mortally wounded in the area.

With a capacity of 32,115 it is the largest only football stadium and the second largest football stadium overall in Greece. It is named after Georgios Karaiskakis, a military commander of the Greek War of Independence, who is considered a national hero and was mortally wounded in the area. 

The stadium will host the 2023 UEFA Super Cup, since due to Russia's suspension from UEFA the original venue in Kazan had to be moved.

History
It was used during the Athens 1896 Summer Olympics, as the Neo Phaliron Velodrome, where Frenchman Paul Masson took the three track cycling gold medals.

It was renovated during the 1960s and hosted the European Winners' Cup Final of 1970–1971, the first European football Final that held in Greece, between Chelsea and Real Madrid. First leg 1-1, second 2-1 and Chelsea won the trophy. The stadium was completely rebuilt in 2004 into a 32,115 capacity, all seater stadium, ready for the football competition of the 2004 Summer Olympics.

The stadium was totally demolished and built again from the beginning, facing a different direction. This complete reconstruction took a record time of only 14 months, finishing just in time for the Olympic Games.
After the last deal ended in 1998, Olympiacos is using the stadium once again, on a 49-year lease from 2003 until 2052 and is traditionally identified as the club's true home. In 2002, the president and owner of Olympiacos Socratis Kokkalis, when announced the project to rebuild Karaiskakis, expressed his wish for the new stadium to be also used by Ethnikos, if they wanted, as Karaiskakis is the historic home of Ethnikos OFPF and Atromitos Piraeus and Olympiacos SFP . Therefore, in the contract signed by the Hellenic Olympic Committee, the owner of the stadium, and Olympiacos, a clause was included, stating that should Ethnikos wish to return to the stadium, they may do so without sharing any significant maintenance or other stadium-related costs, as those are covered by Olympiacos. As of the 2010/11 season though, Ethnikos has not yet opted to do so.

The ticket sales average higher than any team's in recent decades for the Super League Greece history (rarely have they dropped under the 5,000 mark) and are not expected to drop in the foreseeable future.

Sales for national team matches had also been higher, but this was for the most part due to Greece's success in the Euro 2004. As of 2008 and after Greece's disappointing Euro 2008 performance, the attendance of national team matches dropped drastically, leading the Ministry of Sport to change the venue to Heraklion, Crete.

In June 2005, Karaiskakis stadium hosted a movie theatre (Ciné Karaiskakis) with a cinema screen that is 20 m long and 10 m wide, operating daily between 9 and 11 p.m. (6 and 8 p.m. UTC) and later, every weekend. The movie screen featured movies including Batman Begins and others. The stadium operated as a movie theatre for the last time on Saturday 13 August 2005.

The Gate 7 Tragedy

Twenty-one supporters of Olympiacos died in "Gate 7" (Θύρα 7) of the stadium, after a game between Olympiacos and AEK Athens FC (that ended 6–0), on 8 February 1981; an incident widely known as the Karaiskaki Stadium disaster. In memory of this event, at the tribune where Gate 7 is now, twenty-one seats are black colored instead of red, shaping the number "7". A monument on the eastern side of the stadium bears the names of the twenty-one supporters killed on that day in the stadium.

Stadium features

Karaiskakis Stadium is classified as a 4-star football stadium by the UEFA organisation, allowing it to host the UEFA Europa League Final if chosen. It hosts 40 VIP lounges and suites, that can hold up to 474 persons, a press conference hall, that can hold up to 130 seats, 200 seats for press and media coverage, an entire shopping mall, with restaurants, cafés, retail and clothing stores and a gym.

The stadium also hosts Olympiacos Museum, dedicated not only to the history of the football club, but to the history of all the departments of the multiple European title-winning multi-sport club Olympiacos CFP. There are 10 automated ticket selling machines around the stadium enabling reservations through the internet or by phone. There is no extra charge for the parking area, which takes up to 1,000 cars. Due to its design, the stadium's tribunes have the ability to empty within 7 minutes. The stadium also has restaurants and stores opened during concerts and games and sometimes open with the daily general timetable of most Greek stores and shops.

The stadium is easily accessed through the Athens Mass Transit System, at the station "Faliro", which is less than five minutes from the "Piraeus" station, and about 15 minutes from Athens city centre, at the "Omonia" square station and also through Athens driving routes, which is 8 km, about 15 minutes from downtown Athens.

Concerts
Rihanna, Aerosmith, Evanescence, 50 Cent, Scorpions, Whitesnake, Imiskoumbria, Def Leppard and Sex Pistols have performed at the stadium.

Major games

References

External links

Karaiskaki Stadium at olympiacos.org 
Karaiskaki Stadium official website 
New Karaiskaki Stadium at stadia.gr 
Velodrome & Karaiskaki Stadium (1895 – 1964 – 2003) at stadia.gr 
A small tour at the stadium

Venues of the 2004 Summer Olympics
Olympic football venues
Olympiacos F.C.
Ethnikos Piraeus F.C.
Football venues in Greece
Sports venues in Athens
Sports venues in Piraeus
Atromitos Piraeus F.C.
Sports venues completed in 1896
1896 establishments in Greece